Mazus is a genus of low-growing perennial plants. It has been placed in various plant families including Phrymaceae, Scrophulariaceae, and recently in the family Mazaceae. Consisting of around 30 species, this genus is generally found in damp habitats in lowland or mountain regions of China, Japan, Southeast Asia, Australia and New Zealand.

Selected species
Mazus gracilis
Mazus miquelii — Miquel's mazus
Mazus pumilio — Swamp mazus
Mazus pumilus — Japanese mazus
Mazus radicans — Swamp musk
Mazus reptans — Creeping mazus
Mazus surculosus — Suckering mazus

References

 
Lamiales genera